is a one-shot Japanese manga by Kazuka Minami.  It is licensed in North America by Digital Manga Publishing, which released the manga through its imprint 801 Media on August 20, 2007.

Reception
ActiveAnime's Holly Ellingwood describes the story as being "about falling in love, running away, and facing your feelings, this is a little gem of a romance." Shaenon Garrity, writing for the appendix to Manga: The Complete Guide, enjoyed the "sex-positive manga", noting that there was little angst. Mania Entertainment's Danielle Van Gorder described Minami's art as "first-rate", enjoying its "sharp, assured lines, minimal shading, and plenty of detail". Johanna Draper Carlson regards My Paranoid Next Door Neighbor as being "all about the sex", noting the similarities in the storyline to a romance novel where a lower-status female is pursued by a higher-status man.  Carlson admired the manga's steadfastness in including sex scenes, as she regards this as being a key draw of yaoi. An anonymous Publishers Weekly reviewer also noted the similarities to a romance novel, and criticized the youthful appearance of the character designs. The Publishers Weekly reviewer described the manga as having a "saturated atmosphere"..."satisfying the dedicated genre fan".

References

External links

2004 manga
Digital Manga Publishing titles
Josei manga
One-shot manga
Tokuma Shoten manga
Yaoi anime and manga